Raymond Langlois (10 April 1936  12 August 1996) was a Ralliement créditiste and Social Credit party member of the House of Commons of Canada. He was a professor by career.

He was first elected at the Mégantic riding in the 1962 general election, then re-elected there in 1963 and 1965.  While serving in Parliament, he was his party's representative on the House of Commons committee inquiring into the creation of a new Canadian flag.

After completing his term in the 27th Canadian Parliament, Langlois left the House of Commons and did not seek re-election in the 1968 election. He was unsuccessful in an attempt to return to Parliament in the 1972 election at Lapointe riding.

External links
 

1936 births
1996 deaths
Members of the House of Commons of Canada from Quebec
Social Credit Party of Canada MPs
People from Wolseley, Saskatchewan
Fransaskois people